Just Beyond This Forest (also known as Still Only This Forest) is a 1991 Polish war-drama film written and directed by Jan Łomnicki. It was screened in competition at the 48th Venice International Film Festival.

Cast 

Ryszarda Hanin – Kulgawcowa
Joanna Friedman – Rutka
Marta Klubowicz-Różycka – Jaśka 
Marzena Trybała – Rutka's Mother 
Jerzy Moes - The Policeman

References

External links

1991 films
Polish war drama films
1990s war drama films
1991 drama films
Polish World War II films
1990s Polish-language films